Robin Bell Dodson (born 30 May 1956) is a former professional billiards player from Omaha, Nebraska, US.

Early life and career 
Dodson started learning billiards from the age of 12. She won the California Women's State Championship at the age of 16 and continued to win for the next two consecutive years. After a long break, she began to play again in 1984. Between 1984 and 1998, she won various major tournaments, including the National Championships and the WPA World 9-Ball Championships. She was inducted into the BCA Hall of Fame in 2005.

Personal life 
Dodson is married with three sons, including actor and musician Drake Bell.

Dodson is a born again Christian. She has struggled with drug addiction including heroin. She received her GED in 2001.

Titles & achievements
 1984 Lite Beer Series of Tavern Pool 8-Ball
 1984 Caesars Tahoe Billiard Classic
 1985 Resorts International Last Call For 9-Ball
 1985 North California Fall 9-Ball Classic	
 1986 Cleveland Spring 9-Ball Open 
 1988 King of the Rings 8-Ball
 1988 Hard Times 9-Ball Open
 1988 Gina Cue 9-Ball Open
 1989 Cleveland Fall 9-Ball Open	
 1989 WPBA National Championship	
 1990 B.C. Open 9-Ball Pro-Am Doubles 
 1990 WPA World Nine-ball Championship
 1991 Southern California 9-Ball Open
 1991 Brunswick Munich Masters
 1991 WPA World Nine-ball Championship
 1991 International 9-Ball Classic
 1991 Big Island 9-Ball Classic
 1991 Al Romero Classic 9-Ball
 1991 Billiards Digest Player of the Year 
 1992 WPBA U.S. Open 9-Ball Championship
 1992 Brunswick Swedish 9-Ball Cup	
 1992 McDermott Masters 9-Ball Championship
 1993 Hard Times 9-Ball Open
 1993 Tommy Billiards 9-Ball Open 
 1993 Connelly Billiards Tucson Classic	
 1993 Continental Productions Boston Classic	
 1993 Riverside Classic	
 1994 San Diego Classic
 1994 Gordon’s 9-Ball Championship	
 1994 Brunswick Billiards Atlanta Classic 
 1995 BCA Detroit Classic 	
 1995 Kasson Atlanta Classic 	
 1995 Gordon’s Boston 9-Ball Championship
 1995 Connelly Billiards Denver Classic 
 1998 BCA Minnesota Classic
 2005 Billiard Congress of America Hall of Fame
 2009 WPBA Hall of Fame

References 

1956 births
Living people
American pool players
World champions in pool
American Christians